Charles Tyler Ensemble is the debut album by American jazz saxophonist Charles Tyler, which was recorded in 1966 in New York City and released on ESP-Disk.

Background
By 1965, Tyler was added as the third horn in Albert Ayler's band. That association is documented by Bells and Spirits Rejoice. The following year, Bernard Stollman offered Tyler the opportunity to record his first album as leader on ESP-Disk. The band features an unusual instrumentation for its time, using cellist Joel Freedman and bassist Henry Grimes from Albert Ayler's group along with Charles Moffett on mallet instruments and a young Ronald Jackson (later known as Ronald Shannon Jackson) on drums. Although primarily known as a baritone saxophone player, Tyler plays alto saxophone on four original compositions.

Reception

In his review for AllMusic, Michael G. Nastos wrote "With this vivacious music that stretches time parameters and harmonic envelopes, Tyler and his crew bend whatever malleable shapes they can, while burning down the traditional jazz house and still paying homage to bebop."

The JazzTimes review by Lyn Horton notes "Distinguishing Tyler, from Ayler, is the sourness of his flourishes. He avoids lengthy arpeggios, but tends towards eerie high tension phrases, vibratos and nearly realized melodies."

The All About Jazz review by Raul D'Gama Rose says that "Unlike many records of the mid-1960s, it burns with a quiet blue flame, eschewing the intellectual posturing that characterized much new music in the avant-garde era."

Track listing
All compositions by Charles Tyler
 "Strange Uhuru" – 10:01
 "Lacy's Out East" – 6:38
 "Three Spirits" – 8:07 
 "Black Mysticism" – 9:15

Personnel
Joel Freedman – cello
Henry Grimes – bass
Ronald Jackson – drums
Charles Moffett – orchestra vibes
Charles Tyler – alto sax

References

1966 albums
Charles Tyler (musician) albums
ESP-Disk albums